The 1968 Lafayette Leopards football team was an American football team that represented Lafayette College during the 1968 NCAA College Division football season. Lafayette tied for third in the Middle Atlantic Conference, University Division, and placed last in the Middle Three Conference.

In their second year under head coach Harry Gamble, the Leopards compiled a 7–3 record. Richard Lettieri was the team captain.

At 2–2 against MAC University Division foes, Lafayette tied Lehigh and Temple for third place in the eight-team circuit. Lafayette dropped both of its games against Middle Three rivals, losing to Lehigh and Rutgers.

Lafayette played its home games at Fisher Field on College Hill in Easton, Pennsylvania.

Schedule

References

Lafayette
Lafayette
Lafayette Leopards football seasons
Lafayette Leopards football